BIOS is the third album of the Costa Rican music group Gandhi.

Track listing

I: STUDIO
"Comida de animal"
"Miedo"
"Hacia adentro"
"Procesión"
"Un día triste de marzo"
"Sueles dejarme solo"
"Oiga pito"
"LA469 (2001 version)"
"El otro gol

O: LIVE
"Seca roja reja (live)"
"En dibujos animados (live)"
"Clara (live)"
"Nada (live)"
"Mátame (live)"
"Un 1 de un 11 (live)"
"Mi zona (live)"
"Quisieras (live)"
"Páginas perdidas (live)"

El otro gol

"El otro gol" ( or The another goal), known in some compilation albums as "Y otro gol", was a song made by Gandhi in honor to the Costa Rica national football team that classified to the 2002 Fifa World Cup. It was first released as "Y otro gol" in the album ¡Si se pudo! then as "El otro gol" in Bios. The song features a prominent fusion between reggae, pop and rock.

Gandhi (Costa Rican band) albums
Spanish-language albums
2002 albums